Adamaru or Adamaar is a village in the Udupi district of the state of Karnataka, India. The village houses one of the Ashta Mathas founded by Shri Madhvacharya, the Dvaita philosopher. The village can be reached by taking a left turn at Yermal near Kaup town on Udupi-Mangalore route on National Highway 66 while travelling from Mangalore to Udupi.

References

Media 
Udupipages.com

Ashta Mathas of Udupi
Villages in Udupi district